Matheus Cotulio Bossa (born 21 February 1993), known as Matheuzinho or simply Matheus, is a Brazilian footballer.

Club career
Born in Penápolis, São Paulo, Matheuzinho joined Corinthians' youth setup in 2009, aged 16, after starting it out at São Paulo. In 2012, after a short loan stint at Flamengo de Guarulhos, he was promoted to the main squad in 2012 by manager Tite.

On 15 April 2012 Matheuzinho played his first match as a professional, coming on as a late substitute for Vitor Júnior in a 2–1 away win against Ponte Preta for the Campeonato Paulista championship. He subsequently served loans at Bragantino, Grêmio Osasco Audax and Guaratinguetá before being released in 2014.

In 2015 Matheuzinho returned to Audax, now in a permanent deal. On 18 July, after being a regular starter for the club, he was loaned to Primeira Liga side G.D. Estoril Praia in a season-long deal.

On 1 January 2019, Matheuzinho signed for Atlético Goianiense.

Career statistics

References

External links

1993 births
Living people
Footballers from São Paulo (state)
Brazilian footballers
Association football midfielders
Campeonato Brasileiro Série B players
Campeonato Brasileiro Série C players
Campeonato Brasileiro Série D players
Sport Club Corinthians Paulista players
Clube Atlético Bragantino players
Grêmio Osasco Audax Esporte Clube players
Guaratinguetá Futebol players
Atlético Clube Goianiense players
Esporte Clube Juventude players
Vila Nova Futebol Clube players
Primeira Liga players
G.D. Estoril Praia players
Ascenso MX players
FC Juárez footballers
Brazilian expatriate footballers
Brazilian expatriate sportspeople in Portugal
Brazilian expatriate sportspeople in Mexico
Expatriate footballers in Portugal
Expatriate footballers in Mexico
People from Penápolis